Kuh-e Bon may refer to:
 Kuh-e Bon, Gilan
 Kuh-e Bon, Sistan and Baluchestan